Elections to Hartlepool Borough Council in the ceremonial county of County Durham in England were held on 6 May 1999. One third of the council was up for election and the Labour party stayed in overall control of the council. The results saw the Labour party lose two seats to the Liberal Democrats and one seat to the Conservative party. Overall turnout in the election was 26.1%.

Following the election the then council leader, Roy Waller, was challenged as leader of the Labour group on the council by Russell Hart. Hart defeated Waller 16 to 14 in a vote by Labour party councillors at the groups annual meeting and Hart thus became leader of the council.

After the election, the composition of the council was
Labour 30
Liberal Democrat 10
Conservative 6
Independent 1

Election result

Ward results

References

1999 English local elections
1999
1990s in County Durham